The northern shoveler (Spatula clypeata), known simply in Britain as the shoveler, is a common and widespread duck. It breeds in northern areas of Europe and across the Palearctic and across most of North America, wintering in southern Europe, the Indian subcontinent, Southeast Asia, Central, the Caribbean, and northern South America. It is a rare vagrant to Australia. In North America, it breeds along the southern edge of Hudson Bay and west of this body of water, and as far south as the Great Lakes west to Colorado, Nevada, and Oregon.

The northern shoveler is one of the species to which the Agreement on the Conservation of African-Eurasian Migratory Waterbirds (AEWA) applies. The conservation status of this bird is Least Concern.

Taxonomy 
The northern shoveler was first formally described by the Swedish naturalist Carl Linnaeus in 1758 in the tenth edition of his Systema Naturae. He introduced the binomial name Anas clypeata. A molecular phylogentic study comparing mitochondrial DNA sequences published in 2009 found that the genus Anas, as then defined, was non-monophyletic.  The genus was subsequently split into four monophyletic genera with ten species including the northern shoveler moved into the resurrected genus Spatula. This genus had been originally proposed by the German zoologist Friedrich Boie in 1822. The name Spatula is the Latin for a "spoon" or "spatula". The specific epithet is derived from Latin clypeata, "shield-bearing" (from clypeus, "shield").

No living subspecies are accepted today. Fossil bones of a very similar duck have been found in Early Pleistocene deposits at Dursunlu, Turkey. It is unresolved, however, how these birds were related to the northern shoveler of today; i.e., whether the differences noted were due to being a related species or paleosubspecies, or attributable to individual variation.

Description 
This species is unmistakable in the northern hemisphere due to its large spatulate bill. The breeding drake has an iridescent dark green head, white breast and chestnut belly and flanks. In flight, pale blue forewing feathers are revealed, separated from the green speculum by a white border. In early fall the male will have a white crescent on each side of the face. In non-breeding (eclipse) plumage, the drake resembles the female.

The female is a drab mottled brown like other dabblers, with plumage much like a female mallard, but easily distinguished by the long broad bill, which is gray tinged with orange on cutting edge and lower mandible. The female's forewing is gray.

Behavior 

Northern shovelers feed by dabbling for plant food, often by swinging its bill from side to side and using the bill to strain food from the water. They use their highly specialized bill (from which their name is derived) to forage for aquatic invertebrates. Their wide-flat bill is equipped with well-developed lamellae – small, comb-like structures on the edge of the bill that act like sieves, allowing the birds to skim crustaceans and plankton from the water's surface. This adaptation, more specialized in shovelers, gives them an advantage over other puddle ducks, with which they do not have to compete for food resources during most of the year. Thus, mud-bottomed marshes rich in invertebrate life are their habitat of choice.

The shoveler prefers to nest in grassy areas away from open water. Their nest is a shallow depression on the ground, lined with plant material and down. Hens typically lay about nine eggs. The drakes are very territorial during breeding season and will defend their territory and partners from competing males. Drakes also engage in elaborate courtship behaviors, both on the water and in the air; it is not uncommon for a dozen or more males to pursue a single hen. Despite their stout appearance, shovelers are nimble fliers.

This is a fairly quiet species. The male has a clunking call, whereas the female has a Mallard-like quack.

Habitat and range 

This is a bird of open wetlands, such as wet grassland or marshes with some emergent vegetation. It breeds in wide areas across Eurasia, western North America and the Great Lakes region of the United States.

This bird winters in southern Europe, the Indian Subcontinent, the Caribbean, northern South America, Malay Archipelago, Japan and other areas. Those wintering in the Indian Subcontinent make the taxing journey over the Himalayas, often taking a break in wetlands just south of the Himalaya before continuing further south to warmer regions. In North America it winters south of a line from Washington to Idaho and from New Mexico east to Kentucky, also along the Eastern Seaboard as far north as Massachusetts. In the British Isles, home to more than 20% of the North Western European population, it is best known as a winter visitor, although it is more frequently seen in southern and eastern England, especially around the Ouse Washes, the Humber and the North Kent Marshes, and in much smaller numbers in Scotland and western parts of England. In winter, breeding birds move south, and are replaced by an influx of continental birds from further north. It breeds across most of Ireland, but the population there is very difficult to assess. Surveys in 2017 and 2018 suggest that it is more common and widespread  in Ireland 
than previously thought.

It is strongly migratory and winters further south than its breeding range. It has occasionally been reported as a vagrant as far south as Australia, New Zealand and South Africa. It is not as gregarious as some dabbling ducks outside the breeding season and tends to form only small flocks. Among North America's duck species, northern shovelers trail only mallards and blue-winged teal in overall abundance. Their populations have been healthy since the 1960s, and have soared in recent years to more than 5 million birds (2015), most likely because of favorable breeding, migration, and wintering habitat conditions.

References

External links

 Shoveler at RSPB Birds by Name
 Northern Shoveler Species Account – Cornell Lab of Ornithology
 Northern Shoveler - Anas clypeata - USGS Patuxent Bird Identification InfoCenter
Northern Shoveler Species Account at Massachusetts Breeding Bird Atlas
 
 Northern Shoveler on the Birds of India
 

northern shoveler
northern shoveler
Holarctic birds
Birds of Hispaniola
Birds of the Dominican Republic
Birds of Haiti
Birds described in 1758
Taxa named by Carl Linnaeus
Extant Pleistocene first appearances